The 2000–01 Élite Ligue season was the 80th season of the Élite Ligue, the top level of ice hockey in France. Eight teams participated in the league, and the Dragons de Rouen won their sixth league title.

Regular season

Playoffs

External links 
 Season on hockeyarchives.info

France
Elite
Ligue Magnus seasons